"Rag and Bone" is a song by the American garage rock band The White Stripes. It is the ninth track on their 2007 album Icky Thump. The track was released as a free red 7" vinyl with the June 6, 2007 issue of the NME magazine, with a unique Jack White-designed etching on the flipside of each record.

The song is told from the point of view of two rag and bone collectors, portrayed by both Jack and Meg White. The song's conventional verses and choruses are interspersed with a spoken narrative. The single version of the song is a different mix from the version that was later released on the UK LP 'Icky Thump' album. Sean Fennessey of Vibe called the song "the funniest and best track" on Icky Thump.

References

The White Stripes songs
2007 singles
XL Recordings singles
2007 songs
Songs written by Jack White